Ndaka may be,

Ndaka people
Ndaka language